Sepsis punctum is a European species of fly and member of the family Sepsidae.

References

Sepsidae
Diptera of Europe
Taxa named by Johan Christian Fabricius
Insects described in 1794